Manakkodam Lighthouse is situated in the Alappuzha district of Kerala near Cherthala. It was inaugurated on 1 August 1979. There were no lights in this area before 1979. The light source was changed from incandescent lamp to metal halide on 21 September 1998.

The light source flashes twice in ten seconds.

See also 

 List of lighthouses in India

References

External links 

 
 Directorate General of Lighthouses and Lightships

Lighthouses in Kerala
Buildings and structures in Alappuzha district
Transport in Alappuzha district
1979 establishments in Kerala
Lighthouses completed in 1979